This is a list of churches that are U.S. National Historic Landmarks (NHLs) in the United States. This list does not include chapels that are not or have not historically been affiliated with congregations or churches. Nor does it include churches that are contributing properties to National Historic Landmark Districts and not listed individually as NHLs.

A significant proportion of the 2,430 National Historic Landmarks sites in the U.S. are churches.

List

Former NHLs

References 

National Historic Landmarks